is a Japanese Grand Prix motorcycle racer. He currently competes in the Asia Road Race Supersport 600 Championship aboard a Honda CBR600RR. In 2016, he currently competes in the FIM CEV Moto2 European Championship aboard a Kalex Moto2.

Yamada has also previously competed in his native Japan, in the Motegi GP125 Championship, the Tsukuba GP125 Championship, the All Japan Road Race GP125 Championship and the All Japan Road Race J-GP3 Championship, where he was champion in 2013 and 2014. In 2015, Yamada moved to Europe and competed in the FIM CEV Moto3 Junior World Championship.

Career statistics

By season

Races by year

References

External links
 Profile on motogp.com

1994 births
Living people
Japanese motorcycle racers
Moto3 World Championship riders
Sportspeople from Tochigi Prefecture
20th-century Japanese people
21st-century Japanese people